Muggs Presents... The Soul Assassins: Chapter I is the first studio album by American hip hop collective Soul Assassins. It was released on March 4, 1997 via Columbia Records. Recording sessions took place at Larrabee Sound Studios and at Ameraycan Studios in Los Angeles, at The Hit Factory, at D&D Studios and at Chung King Studios in New York, and at The Hill. Produced entirely by DJ Muggs, it features contributions from B-Real, Dr. Dre, Goodie Mob, RZA, GZA, La the Darkman, MC Eiht, KRS-One, Mobb Deep, Infamous Mobb, Call O' Da Wild and Wyclef Jean. The album peaked at number 20 in the United States, at number 28 in France, at number 80 in the Netherlands, and at number 86 in the UK. Its sequel, Muggs Presents Soul Assassins II, was released on October 3, 2000.

Track listing

Charts

References

External links

1997 albums
DJ Muggs albums
Soul Assassins albums
Columbia Records albums
Albums produced by DJ Muggs
Albums recorded at Chung King Studios